Sergei Pavlovich Korolev (14 January 1966) was a lead Soviet rocket engineer and spacecraft designer during the Space Race between the United States and the Soviet Union in the 1950s and 1960s. He is regarded by many as the father of practical astronautics. He was involved in the development of the R-7 Rocket, Sputnik 1, launching Laika, Sputnik 3, the first human-made object to make contact with another celestial body, Belka and Strelka, the first human being, Yuri Gagarin, into space, Voskhod 1, and the first person, Alexei Leonov, to conduct a spacewalk.

Although Korolev trained as an aircraft designer, his greatest strengths proved to be in design integration, organization and strategic planning. Arrested on a false official charge as a "member of an anti-Soviet counter-revolutionary organization" (which would later be reduced to "saboteur of military technology"), he was imprisoned in 1938 for almost six years, including a few months in a Kolyma labour camp. Following his release he became a recognized rocket designer and a key figure in the development of the Soviet Intercontinental ballistic missile program. He later directed the Soviet space program and was made a Member of Soviet Academy of Sciences, overseeing the early successes of the Sputnik and Vostok projects including the first human Earth orbit mission by Yuri Gagarin on 12 April 1961. Korolev's unexpected death in 1966 interrupted implementation of his plans for a Soviet crewed Moon landing before the United States 1969 mission.

Before his death he was officially identified only as Glavny Konstruktor, or the Chief Designer, to protect him from possible Cold War assassination attempts by the United States. Even some of the cosmonauts who worked with him were unaware of his last name; he only went by Chief Designer. Only following his death in 1966 was his identity revealed and he received the appropriate public recognition as the driving force behind Soviet accomplishments in space exploration during and following the International Geophysical Year.

Early life

Korolev was born in the city of Zhytomyr, the capital of Volhynian Governorate of the Russian Empire (now in Ukraine). His father, Pavel Yakovlevich Korolev, was born in Mogilev to a Russian soldier and a Belarusian mother. His mother, Maria Nikolaevna Koroleva (Moskalenko/Bulanina), was a daughter of a wealthy merchant from the city of Nezhin (now Nizhyn, Ukraine), with Zaporozhian Cossack, Greek and Polish heritage.

His father moved to Zhytomyr to be a teacher of the Russian language. Three years after Sergei's birth the couple separated due to financial difficulties. Although Pavel later wrote to Maria requesting a meeting with his son, Sergei was told by his mother that his father had allegedly died. Sergei never saw his father after the family break-up, and Pavel died in 1929 before his son learned the truth.

Korolev grew up in Nizhyn, under the care of his maternal grandparents Nikolay Yakovlevich Moskalenko who was a trader of the Second Guild and Maria Matveevna Moskalenko (née Fursa), a daughter of a local cossack. Korolev's mother also had a sister Anna and two brothers Yuri and Vasily. Maria Koroleva was frequently away attending Women's higher education courses in Kiev. As a child, Korolev was stubborn, persistent, and argumentative. Sergei grew up a lonely child with few friends. Korolev began reading at an early age, and his abilities in mathematics and other subjects made him a favorite student of his teachers, but caused jealousy from his peers. He later stated in an interview, the torment of classmates bullying and teasing him as a small child encouraged his focus on academic work. His mother divorced Pavel in 1915 and in 1916 married Grigory Mikhailovich Balanin, an electrical engineer who had been educated in Germany but who had to attend the Kyiv Polytechnic University because German engineering diplomas were not recognized in Russia. After getting a job with the regional railway, Grigory moved the family to Odessain 1917, where they endured hardships with many other families through the tumultuous years following the Russian Revolution and continuing internecine struggles until the Bolsheviks assumed unchallenged power in 1920. Local schools were closed and young Korolev had to continue his studies at home. Grigory proved a good influence on his step-son, who suffered from a bout of typhus during the severe food shortages of 1919.

Education

Korolev received vocational training in carpentry and in various academics at the Odessa Building Trades School (Stroyprofshkola No. 1). Enjoyment of a 1913 air show inspired interest in aeronautical engineering. Korolev began designing a glider as a diversion while studying for his graduation exams at the vocational school. He made an independent study of flight theory, and worked in the local glider club. A detachment of military seaplanes had been stationed in Odessa, and Korolev took a keen interest in their operations.

In 1923 he joined the Society of Aviation and Aerial Navigation of Ukraine and the Crimea (OAVUK). He had his first flying lesson after joining the Odessa hydroplane squadron and had many opportunities to fly as a passenger. In 1924 he personally designed an OAVUK construction project glider called the K-5. He briefly trained in gymnastics until his academic work suffered from this distraction. Korolev hoped to attend the Zhukovsky Academy in Moscow, but his qualifications did not meet the academy's standards. He attended the Kiev Polytechnic Institute's aviation branch in 1924 while living with his uncle Yuri, and earning money to pay for his courses by performing odd jobs. His curriculum was technically oriented, and included various engineering, physics and mathematics classes. He met and became attracted to a classmate, Xenia Vincentini, who would later become his first wife. In 1925 he was accepted into a limited class on glider construction, and suffered two broken ribs flying the training glider they built. He continued courses at Kiev until he was accepted into the Bauman Moscow State Technical University (MVTU, BMSTU) in July 1926, having the famous aircraft designer Andrei Tupolev as his mentor, who was a professor at his University.

Korolev studied specialized aviation topics until 1929, while living with his family in the typically crowded conditions of Moscow. Korolev enjoyed opportunities to fly gliders and powered aircraft during this part of his education. He designed a glider in 1928, and flew it in a competition the next year. The Communist Party accelerated the education of engineers in 1929 to meet the country's urgent need for their skills. Korolev obtained a diploma by producing a practical aircraft design by the end of the year.

Early career

After graduation, Korolev worked with some of the best Soviet designers at the 4th Experimental Section aircraft design bureau OPO-4 headed by  who emigrated to the USSR from France in the 1920s. He did not stand out in this group, but while so employed he also worked independently to design a glider capable of performing aerobatics. In 1930 he became interested in the possibilities of liquid-fueled rocket engines to propel airplanes, while working at the Central Aerohydrodynamic Institute (TsAGI) as a lead engineer on the Tupolev TB-3 heavy bomber. Korolev earned his pilot's license in 1930 and explored the operational limits of the aircraft he piloted, wondering what was beyond his plane's altitude limit and how he could get there. Many believe this was the start of his interest in space.

Korolev married Xenia Vincentini on 6 August 1931. He had first proposed marriage to her in 1924, but she then declined so she might continue her higher education. In 1931, Korolev and space travel enthusiast Friedrich Zander participated in the creation of the Group for the Study of Reactive Motion (GIRD), one of the earliest state-sponsored centers for rocket development in the USSR. In May 1932 Korolev was appointed chief of the group; and military interest encouraged funding of group projects. On August 18, 1933, GIRD launched the first hybrid propellant rocket, the GIRD-09, and on November 25, 1933, the Soviet's first liquid-fueled rocket GIRD-X.

Growing military interest in this new technology caused GIRD to be merged with the Gas Dynamics Laboratory (GDL) at Leningrad in 1933 to create the Reactive Scientific Research Institute (RNII), which brought together the best of the Soviet rocket talent, including Korolev, Georgy Langemak, and former GDL engine designer Valentin Glushko. Korolev was appointed deputy head under Ivan Kleymyonov, however in 1934, following a disagreement over the direction of RNII, Korolev was demoted to section chief of winged missiles and was replaced by Georgy Langemak. Korolev supervised development of cruise missiles and a crewed rocket-powered glider. "Rocket Flight in Stratosphere" was published by Korolev in 1934. On 10 April 1935, Korolev's wife gave birth to their daughter, Natalya; and they moved out of Sergei's parents' home and into their own apartment in 1936. Both Korolev and his wife had careers, and Sergei always spent long hours at his design office.

Imprisonment
 
Joseph Stalin's Great Purge severely damaged RNII, with Director Kleymyonov and Chief Engineer Langemak arrested in November 1937, tortured, made to sign false confessions and later executed. Glushko was arrested in March 1938 and with many other leading engineers was imprisoned in the Gulag. Korolev was arrested by the NKVD on 27 June 1938 after being accused of a variety of charges, including false charges extracted from Kleymyonov, Langemak and Glushko. He was tortured in the Lubyanka prison to extract a confession. Glushko and Korolev had reportedly been denounced by Andrei Kostikov who became the head of RNII after its leadership was arrested.

Korolev was sent to prison, where he wrote many appeals to the authorities, including Stalin himself. Following the fall of NKVD head Nikolai Yezhov, the new chief Lavrenti Beria chose to retry Korolev on reduced charges in 1939; but by that time Korolev was on his way from prison to a Gulag forced labour camp in Kolyma in the far east of Siberia, where he spent several months in a gold mine before word reached him of his retrial. Work camp conditions of inadequate food, shelter, and clothing killed thousands of prisoners each month. Korolev sustained injuries, including possibly a heart attack and lost most of his teeth from scurvy before being returned to Moscow in late 1939. When he reached Moscow, Korolev's sentence was reduced to eight years. However, due to the intervention by his old mentor, Andrei Tupolev, he was relocated to a prison for scientist and engineers in September 1940. These were labor camps where scientists and engineers worked on projects assigned by the Communist party leadership. The Central Design Bureau 29 (CKB-29, ЦКБ-29) of the NKVD, served as Tupolev's engineering facility, and Korolev was brought here to work. During World War II, this sharashka designed both the Tupolev Tu-2 bomber and the Petlyakov Pe-2 dive bomber. The group was moved several times during the war, the first time to avoid capture by advancing German forces. Korolev was moved in 1942 to the sharashka of Kazan OKB-16 under Glushko. Korolev and Glushko designed the RD-1 kHz auxiliary rocket motor tested in an unsuccessful fast-climb Lavochkin La-7R. Korolev was isolated from his family until 27 June 1944 when healong with Tupolev, Glushko and otherswas finally discharged by special government decree, although the charges against him were not dropped until 1957.

Korolev rarely talked about his experience in the Gulag, and lived under constant fear of being executed for the military secrets he possessed. He was deeply affected by his time in the camp, becoming reserved and cautious as a result. He later learned that Glushko was one of his accusers, and this was likely the cause of the lifelong animosity between the two men. The design bureau was handed over from NKVD control to the government's aviation industry commission. Korolev continued working with the bureau for another year, serving as deputy designer under Glushko and studying various rocket designs.

Ballistic missiles
Korolev was commissioned into the Red Army with the rank of colonel in 1945; his first military decoration was the Badge of Honor, awarded in 1945 for his work on the development of rocket motors for military aircraft. On 8 September 1945, Korolev was brought to Germany along with many other experts to recover the technology of the German V-2 rocket. The Soviets worked with German specialists to understand and replicate the rocket technology, placing a priority on recreating the entire German V-2 rocket. In February 1946 the Institute Nordhausen was formed, with Korolev as Chief Engineer, Glushko as head of Engine assembly and propulsion systems and German Helmut Gröttrup, who previously worked with Wernher von Braun, as General Director. The work continued in East Germany until late 1946, when 2,000+ German scientists and engineers were sent to the USSR through Operation Osoaviakhim. Most of the German experts, Gröttrup being an exception, had not worked directly with Wernher von Braun. Many of the leading German rocket scientists, including Dr. von Braun himself, surrendered to Americans and were transported to the United States as part of Operation Paperclip.

Stalin made rocket and missile development a national priority upon signing a decree on 13 May 1946, and a new institute called Scientific Research Institute No. 88 (NII-88) was created for that purpose, in the suburbs of Moscow. Development of ballistic missiles was placed under the military control of Dmitriy Ustinov through the decree signed by Stalin, and Ustinov appointed Korolev as chief designer of long-range missiles at Department No. 3 of NII-88.  During this period Korolev demonstrated his organisation and management capabilities by organising a “Council of Chief Designers”, which assisted in circumnavigating the bureaucratic hierarchy of the Soviet missile industry.  This group eventually assumed engineering control over the early Soviet space program.

Korolev returned from Germany in February 1947 and took up his duties as chief designer and Head of Department No 3 of NII-88, initially tasked with reproduction of the V-2. The Soviets were only able to obtain parts to assemble approximately a dozen V-2 rockets, so the decision was made to replicate a Soviet version, which was designated the R-1. Initially Korolev opposed this decision as he thought it was a waste of time and they should move immediately move to manufacture a more advanced version, which had been designated the R-2. However Korolev was overruled and was ordered to assemble what V-2s they had for flight testing, then create the R-1 using Soviet infrastructure and materials. The Germans provided a variety of support to the Soviet efforts, particularly on assembling the V-2 and creating the R-1.

The first Soviet tests of V-2 rockets took place in October 1947 at Kapustin Yar, with Korolev as management lead for the project. Numerous German engineers also participated in the tests. A total of 11 V-2 rockets were launched, with 5 reaching their designated targets. In September 1948 testing of the R-1 began at Kapustin Yar, where Korolev was a formal member of the “State Commission for testing the R-1”. No Germans participated in these tests, which launched 9 rockets between September and November 1948.

Korolev continued to lobby for the design and construction of the R-2, including meeting with Stalin in April 1947, but faced competition from a proposal from the Germans, called the G-1. Whilst the German proposal was initially supported by Soviet management, Korolev opposed utilising German specialist for personal reasons and basically ignored their suggestions and advice. Due to political and security concerns, German specialists were not allowed knowledge or access to any Soviet missile design and in December 1948 work on the G-1 proposal was terminated. The Ministry of Defence decided to dissolve the German team in 1950 and repatriated the German engineers and their families between December 1951 and November 1953.

In April 1948 the go ahead for “scientific and experimental work" was approved, which lead to the creation of the R-2. The R-2 doubled the range of the V-2, and was the first design to utilize a separate warhead.

Glushko couldn't obtain the required thrust from the R-3 engines, so the project was canceled in 1952; and Korolev joined the Soviet Communist Party that year to request money from the government for future projects including the R-5, with a more modest  range. It completed a first successful flight by 1953. The world's first true intercontinental ballistic missile (ICBM) was the R-7 Semyorka. After several test failures, the R-7 successfully launched on 21 August 1957, sending a dummy payload to the Kamchatka Peninsula. Because of Korolev's success with the R-7 and because the Soviet Union had successfully created the ICBM before the United States of America, he was nationally recognized by the Soviet Union, although his name was kept secret. However, despite the Soviet R-7 initial success, it experienced later failures as it was not intended to be a practical weapon. On 19 April 1957 Korolev was declared fully "rehabilitated", as the government acknowledged that his sentence was unjust.

Space program
Korolev was keenly aware of the orbital possibilities of the rockets being designed as ICBMs. He had brought up the idea of using the R-7 to launch a satellite into space to the Central Committee of the Communist Party on 26 May 1954, but was rejected as the Communist Party was uninterested. Korolev's Tikhonravov group filed exaggerated Soviet newspaper articles which were referred by the press of the United States of America. This influenced American authorities to start satellite programs, announced on 29 July 1955 by the Eisenhower administration. While the US government debated the idea of spending millions of dollars on this concept, Korolev's group suggested the international prestige of launching a satellite before the United States could act. Korolev sent another proposal (attached with American newspaper articles about the US program) on 5 August, and on 8 August the Soviet leadership approved Korolev's satellite project. The spirit of cold war competition was adequate to secure approval for the project.

German specialists faced similar difficulties in the USA as their compatriots in the USSR. The American leadership wanted to give priority to "100% Americans", and Wernher von Braun himself was pushed away from design work and, unlike S.Korolev had enough time to popularize cosmonautics and perform on television. But it worked against the speed of the rocket design work. Korolev's team won the space race in 1957.

Sputnik 1 was designed and constructed in less than a month by the Tikhonravov group, with Korolev personally managing the assembly at a hectic pace. The satellite was a simple polished metal sphere no bigger than a beach ball, containing batteries that powered a transmitter using 4 external communication antennas. Sputnik 1 was successfully completed and launched into space on 4 October 1957 using a rocket that had successfully launched only once before. It was the very first artificial satellite of earth.

International response to the accomplishment was electrifying, and political ramifications continued for decades. Nikita Khrushchev — initially bored with the idea of another "Korolev rocket launch" — was pleased with this success after the wide recognition, and encouraged launch of a more sophisticated satellite less than a month later, in time for the 40th anniversary of the October Revolution on 3 November.

Korolev and close associate Mstislav Keldysh wished to up the ante of building a second, larger satellite by proposing the idea of putting a dog on board, which sufficiently caught the interest of the Soviet Academy of Sciences. This new Sputnik 2 spacecraft had six times the mass of the Sputnik 1, and carried the dog Laika as a payload. The entire vehicle was designed from scratch within four weeks, with no time for testing or quality checks. It was successfully launched on 3 November and Laika was placed in orbit. There was no mechanism to bring the dog back to Earth; the dog died from heat exhaustion after five hours in space.

The instrument-laden Sputnik 3 spacecraft was launched initially on 27 April 1958, but the satellite had a failure with the engine which caused the satellite to fall back down to earth in separate pieces. On 15 May 1958, Sputnik 3 was successfully launched into orbit. The tape recorder that was to store the data failed after launch. As a result, the discovery and mapping of the Van Allen radiation belts was left to the United States' Explorer 3 and Pioneer 3 satellites. Sputnik 3 left little doubt with the American government about the Soviets' pending ICBM capability.

The Moon

Even before the Sputnik 1 launch, Korolev was interested in getting to the Moon. He came up with the notion to modify the R-7 missile in order to carry a package to the Moon. However, it was not until 1958 that this idea was approved, after Korolev wrote a letter explaining that his current technology would make it possible to get to the Moon. A modified version of the R-7 launch vehicle was used with a new upper stage. The engine for this final stage was the first designed to be fired in outer space. Mechta is the Russian word meaning "dream", and this is the name Korolev called his moon ships. Officially, the Soviet Union called them Lunas. The first three lunar probes launched in 1958 all failed in part because of political pressure forcing the launches to be rushed with an inadequate budget to test and develop the hardware properly before they were ready to fly. Korolev thought political infighting in Moscow was responsible for the lack of sufficient funding for the program, although the US space program at this early phase also had a scarcely enviable launch record. Once, when pressured to beat the US to a working lunar probe, Korolev allegedly exclaimed: "Do you think that only American rockets explode!?" Nevertheless, this probe became the first to reach escape velocity and the first to go near the Moon, as well as becoming the first man-made object to enter the Sun's orbit. A subsequent attempt (Luna E-1A No.1) failed at launch, and then Luna 2 successfully impacted the surface on 14 September 1959, giving the Soviets another first. This was followed just one month later by an even greater success with Luna 3. It was launched only two years after Sputnik 1, and on 7 October 1959 was the first spacecraft to photograph the far side of the Moon, which was something the people of earth had never seen beforehand.

The Luna missions were intended to make a successful soft landing on the Moon, but Korolev was unable to see a success. Luna 4 and Luna 6 both missed, Luna 5, Luna 7, and Luna 8 all crashed on the Moon. It was not until after Korolev's death that the Soviet Union successfully achieved a soft landing on the Moon with the Luna 9.

Towards the latter part of Korolev's life, he had been working on projects for reaching the planets Mars and Venus, and even had spacecraft ready to reach both. The United States was also working towards reaching these planets, so it was a race to see who would be successful. Korolev's two initial Mars probes suffered from engine failures, and the five probes the Soviet Union launched in hopes of reaching Venus all failed between 1961 and 1962, Korolev himself supervised the launches of all probes.

On 1 November 1962, the Soviet Union successfully launched the Mars 1 and although communications failed, was the very first to complete a flyby of Mars. Later, the Soviet Union launched Venera 3, which was the very first impact of Venus. It was not until after Korolev's death that the Soviet Union impacted Mars.

Korolev's group was also working on ambitious programs for missions to Mars and Venus, putting a man in orbit, launching communication, spy and weather satellites, and making a soft-landing on the Moon. A radio communication center needed to be built in the Crimea, near Simferopol and near Evpatoria to control the spacecraft. Many of these projects were not realized in his lifetime, and none of the planetary probes performed a completely successful mission until after his death.

Human spaceflight

Although he was having ideas since 1948, Korolev's planning for the piloted mission began in 1958 with design studies for the future Vostok spacecraft. It was to hold a single passenger in a space suit, and be fully automated. The space suit, unlike the United States' pure oxygen system, was 80 percent nitrogen and only 20 percent oxygen. The capsule had an escape mechanism for problems prior to launch, and a soft-landing and ejection system during the recovery. The spacecraft was spherical, just like the Sputnik design, and Korolev explained his reasoning for this by saying "the spherical shape would be more stable dynamically". Beginning with work on the Vostok, Konstantin Feoktistov was recruited directly by Korolev to be the principal designer for crewed spaceflight vehicles.

On 15 May 1960 an uncrewed prototype performed 64 orbits of the Earth, but the reentry maneuver failed. On 28 July 1960, two dogs by the names of Chaika and Lishichka were launched into space, but the mission was unsuccessful when an explosion killed the dogs. However, on 19 August, the Soviet Union became the first to successfully recover living creatures back to Earth. The dogs, Belka and Strelka were successfully launched into space on a Vostok spacecraft and they completed eighteen orbits. Following this, the Soviet Union sent a total of six dogs into space, two in pairs, and two paired with a dummy. Unfortunately, not all the missions were successful. After gaining approval from the government, a modified version of Korolev's R-7 was used to launch Yuri Alexeevich Gagarin into orbit on 12 April 1961, which was before the United States was able to put Alan Shepard into space. Korolev served as capsule coordinator, and was able to speak to Gagarin who was inside the capsule. Gagarin was followed by additional Vostok flights, culminating with 81 orbits completed by Vostok 5 and the launch of Valentina Tereshkova as the first woman cosmonaut in space aboard Vostok 6.

Korolev proposed communications satellites and the Vostok craft was a spinoff from the Zenit spy satellite useful for photographic reconnaissance and the mission Vostok 1 had its defense importance acknowledged by the military. Korolev planned to move forward with Soyuz craft able to dock with other craft in orbit and exchange crews. He was directed by Khrushchev to cheaply produce more 'firsts' for the piloted program, including a multi-crewed flight. Korolev was reported to have resisted the idea as the Vostok was a one-man spacecraft and the three-man Soyuz was several years away from being able to fly. Khrushchev was not interested in technical excuses and let it be known that if Korolev could not do it, he would give the work to his rival, Vladimir Chelomey. But Russian Space Web describes this demand by Khrushchev as a legend and Challenge to Apollo says that the evidence that Khrushchev would have ordered these missions does not survive scrutiny.

Cosmonaut Alexei Leonov describes the authority Korolev commanded at this time.

Long before we met him, one man dominated much of our conversation in the early days of our training; Sergei Pavlovich Korolev, the mastermind behind the Soviet space program. He was only ever referred to by the initials of his first two names, SP, or by the mysterious title of "Chief Designer", or simply "Chief". For those on the space program there was no authority higher. Korolev had the reputation of being a man of the highest integrity, but also of being extremely demanding. Everyone around him was on tenterhooks, afraid of making a wrong move and invoking his wrath. He was treated like a god.

Leonov recalls the first meeting between Korolev and the cosmonauts.

The Voskhod was designed as an incremental improvement on the Vostok to meet Khruschev's goal. As a single capsule would be ineffective for proper travel to the Moon, the vehicle needed to be able to hold more people. Khrushchev ordered Korolev to launch three people on the Voskhod capsule quickly, as the United States had already completed a two-man mission with Gemini. Korolev accepted, on the condition that more backing would be given to his N-1 rocket program. One of the difficulties in the design of the Voskhod was the need to land it via parachute. The three-person crew could not bail out and land by parachute, since the altitude would not be survivable. So the craft would need much larger parachutes in order to land safely. Early tests with the craft resulted in some failures until use of stronger fabric improved parachute reliability.

The resulting Voskhod was a stripped-down vehicle from which any excess weight had been removed; although a backup retrofire engine was added, since the more powerful Voskhod rocket used to launch the craft would send it to a higher orbit than the Vostok, eliminating the possibility of a natural decay of the orbit and reentry in case of primary retrorocket failure. After one uncrewed test flight, this spacecraft carried a crew of three cosmonauts, Komarov, Yegorov and Feoktistov, into space on 12 October 1964 and completed sixteen orbits. This craft was designed to perform a soft landing, eliminating a need for the ejection system; but the crew was sent into orbit without space suits or a launch abort system.

With the Americans planning a space walk with their Gemini program, the Soviets decided to trump them again by performing a space walk on the second Voskhod launch. After rapidly adding an airlock, the Voskhod 2 was launched on 18 March 1965, and Alexei Leonov performed the world's first space walk. The flight very nearly ended in disaster, as Leonov was just barely able to re-enter through the airlock, and plans for further Voskhod missions were shelved. In the meantime the change of Soviet leadership with the fall of Khrushchev meant that Korolev was back in favor and given charge of beating the US to landing a man on the Moon.

For the Moon race, Korolev's staff started to design the immense N1 rocket in 1961, using the NK-15 liquid fuel rocket engine. He also was working on the design for the Soyuz spacecraft that was intended to carry crews to LEO and to the Moon. As well, Korolev was designing the Luna series of vehicles that would soft-land on the Moon and make robotic missions to Mars and Venus. Unexpectedly, he died in January 1966, before he could see his various plans brought to fruition.

Criticism

Engineer Sergei Khrushchev, son of former Soviet Premier Nikita Khrushchev, explained in an interview some shortcomings of Korolev's approach, which in his opinion is why the Soviets didn't land on the Moon:

Another reason the Soviet crewed lunar program didn't succeed was the rivalry between Korolev and Vladimir Chelomey. Their animosity was due to the intolerable persona of both men, and their desire for leadership at any cost. The two never said a harsh word about each other either in public or in private, but toppled each other's projects in any way possible. Instead of dividing competencies and responsibilities and cooperating in order to pursue the same goal, the two struggled for leadership in the space program. According to Khrushchev, who worked for Chelomey and knew both men well, they both would have preferred the Americans to land on the Moon first rather than their rival.

Death

On 3 December 1960, Korolev suffered his first heart attack. During his convalescence, it was also discovered that he was suffering from a kidney disorder, a condition brought on by his detention in the Soviet prison camps. He was warned by the doctors that if he continued to work as intensely as he had, he would not live long. Korolev became convinced that Khrushchev was only interested in the space program for its propaganda value and feared that he would cancel it entirely if the Soviets started losing their leadership to the United States, so he continued to push himself.

By 1962, Korolev's health problems were beginning to accumulate and he was suffering from numerous ailments. He had a bout of intestinal bleeding that led to him being taken to the hospital in an ambulance. In 1964 doctors diagnosed him with cardiac arrhythmia. In February he spent ten days in the hospital after a heart problem. Shortly after he was suffering from inflammation of his gallbladder. The mounting pressure of his workload was also taking a heavy toll, and he was suffering from a lot of fatigue. Korolev was also experiencing hearing loss, possibly from repeated exposure to loud rocket-engine tests.

The actual circumstances of Korolev's death remain somewhat uncertain. In December 1965, he was supposedly diagnosed with a bleeding polyp in his large intestine. He entered the hospital on 5 January 1966 for somewhat routine surgery, but died nine days later. It was stated by the government that he had what turned out to be a large, cancerous tumor in his abdomen, but Valentin Glushko later reported that he actually died due to a poorly performed operation for hemorrhoids. Another version states that the operation was going well and no one was predicting any complications. Suddenly, during the operation, Korolev started to bleed. Doctors tried to provide intubation to allow him to breathe freely, but his jaws, injured during his time in a Gulag, had not healed properly and impeded the installation of the breathing tube. Korolev died without regaining consciousness. According to Harford, Korolev's family confirmed the cancer story. His weak heart contributed to his death during surgery.

Under a policy initiated by Stalin and continued by his successors, the identity of Korolev was not revealed until after his death. The purported reason was to protect him from foreign agents from the United States. As a result, the Soviet people didn't become aware of his accomplishments until after his death. His obituary was published in the Pravda newspaper on 16 January 1966, showing a photograph of Korolev with all his medals. Korolev's ashes were interred with state honors in the Kremlin Wall.

Korolev is often compared to Wernher von Braun as the leading architect of the Space Race. Like von Braun, Korolev had to compete continually with rivals, such as Vladimir Chelomey, who had their own plans for flights to the Moon. Unlike the Americans, he also had to work with technology that in many aspects was less advanced than what was available in the United States, particularly in electronics and computers, and to cope with extreme political pressure.

Korolev's successor in the Soviet space program was Vasily Mishin, a quite competent engineer who had served as his deputy and right-hand man. After Korolev died, Mishin became the Chief Designer, and he inherited what turned out to be a flawed N1 rocket program. In 1972, Mishin was fired and then replaced by a rival, Valentin Glushko, after all four N-1 test launches failed. By that time, the rival Americans had already made it to the Moon, and so the program was canceled by CPSU General Secretary Leonid Brezhnev.

Personal life
The Soviet émigré Leonid Vladimirov related the following description of Korolev by Valentin Glushko at about this time:

Korolev was rarely known to drink alcoholic beverages, and chose to live a fairly austere lifestyle.

His career also contributed to instability in his personal life. About 1946, the marriage of Korolev and Vincentini began to break up. Vincentini was heavily occupied with her own career, and about this time Korolev had an affair with a younger woman named Nina Ivanovna Kotenkova, who was an English interpreter in the Podlipki office. Vincentini, who still loved Korolev and was angry over the infidelity, divorced him in 1948. Korolev and Kotenkova were married in 1949, but he is known to have had affairs even after this second marriage.

Korolev's passion for his work was a characteristic that made him a great leader. He was committed to training younger engineers to move into his space and missile projects, even while consumed with his own work. Korolev knew that students would be the future of space exploration, which is why he made such an effort to communicate with them. Arkady Ostashev was one of Korolev's students, who Korolev hired to do dissertation work before later becoming an engineer and working on the R-2.

Awards and honours

Korolev, ultimately, will be remembered for the new genre of science and innovation management, a program manager, an idea that was not fully understood or realized until the 1990s. Korolev, an engineer by training, was able to navigate the unpredictable and dangerous Soviet politics of Moscow, secure funding and support of leadership to the cause that was only vaguely defined (space exploration), create a shared vision to sell the idea to an extended set of disparate stakeholders, create an entirely new segment of science and, finally, deliver a concrete value that defied imaginations. This genre of program management and its ability to make a profound impact, found parallels and support in 90's Silicon valley where Korolev enjoys a cult following and remains an inspiration as the "startup CEO."

Among his awards, Korolev was twice honored as Hero of Socialist Labour, in 1956 and 1961. He was also a Lenin Prize winner in 1971, and was awarded the Order of Lenin three times, the Order of the Badge of Honour and the Medal "For Labour Valour".

In 1958 he was elected to the Academy of Sciences of the USSR. In 1969 and 1986, the USSR issued 10 kopek postage stamps honoring Korolev. In addition he was made an Honorary Citizen of Korolyov and received the Medal "In Commemoration of the 800th Anniversary of Moscow".

Sergei Khrushchev claimed that the Nobel Prize committee attempted to award Korolev but the award was turned down by Khrushchev in order to maintain harmony within the Council of Chief Designers.

In 1990, Korolev was inducted into the International Air & Space Hall of Fame at the San Diego Air & Space Museum.

Namesakes
A street in Moscow was named after Korolev in 1966 and is now called Ulitsa Akademika Korolyova (Academician Korolyov Street). The memorial home-museum of akademician S.P.Korolyov was established in 1975 in the house where Korolev lived from 1959 till 1966 (Moscow, 6th Ostankinsky Lane,2/28). In 1976 he was inducted into the International Space Hall of Fame.
	
The town of Kaliningrad (historic name Podlipki, Moscow region) was renamed Korolev in honour of Korolev in 1996. There is now an oversized statue of Korolev located in the town square. The town is the home of RSC Energia, the largest space company in Russia. RSC Energia was also renamed to S.P. Korolev Rocket and Space Corporation Energia in later years.

Astronomical features named after Korolev include the crater Korolev on the far side of the Moon, a crater on Mars, and the asteroid 1855 Korolyov.

Quite a large number of streets exist with his name in Russia as well as in Ukraine.

A visual phenomenon iconic to a type of rocket staging event is named the Korolev cross in honor of Korolev.

Aeroflot named a brand new Boeing 777 after Korolev in 2021.

Portrayals in fiction
The first portrayal of Korolev in Soviet cinema was made in the 1972 film Taming of the Fire, in which Korolev was played by Kirill Lavrov.

Korolev appeared briefly in a film-within-a-film in 1983's The Right Stuff during the administration of Dwight D. Eisenhower, inside one of the President's conference rooms.

In 1991's Star Trek VI: The Undiscovered Country, a United Federation of Planets Starfleet Constitution-class ship and a class of Starfleet ships are named after Korolev.

The Russian 304 class ship in Stargate SG-1 was named after Korolev.

The 2001 story The Chief Designer by Andy Duncan is a fictionalized account of Korolev's career.

Korolev's death is discussed by Jack Ryan and Simon Harding in the 2002 spy novel, Red Rabbit.

The character of Aleksandr Leonovitch Granin in the 2004 video game Metal Gear Solid 3: Snake Eater is inspired by Korolev.

He was played by Steve Nicolson in the 2005 BBC co-produced docudrama Space Race.

Korolev opens the 2007 graphic novel Laika by Nick Abadzis.

Korolev plays a major role in the 2009 graphic novel T-Minus: The Race to The Moon by Zander Cannon, Jim Ottaviani and Kevin Cannon

The science fiction novel by Paolo Aresi titled Korolev was published in the Italian magazine series Urania in April 2011.

In 2011 the British writer Rona Munro produced the play Little Eagles on Korolev's life – its premiere was from 16 April to 7 May 2011, in an RSC production at the Hampstead Theatre, with Korolev played by Darrel D'Silva and Yuri Gagarin by Dyfan Dwyfor.

He was played by Mikhail Filippov in the 2013 Russian film Gagarin: First in Space.

Public Service Broadcasting released a remix album in 2016, which included two remixes of a track named "Korolev", after Sergei Korolev.

He was portrayed by Vladimir Ilyin in the 2017 Russian film The Age of Pioneers.

According to Ronald D. Moore, the creator of the alternate history TV series For All Mankind, the divergence point of the alternate timeline was that Korolev instead survives the surgery in 1966, which leads to the Soviets landing on the moon first. Korolev then also appears in the second season, where he is portrayed by Endre Hules.

Korolev city is the name of the fictional human colony on Mars in the Brazilian sci-fi novel Crônicas do Cretáceo (The Cretaceous Chronicles), published in 2020.

See also

 Hermann Oberth
 History of rockets
 Kerim Kerimov
 List of aerospace engineers
 Maxime Faget
 Mstislav Keldysh
 Robert Ludvigovich Bartini
 Soviet rocketry
 Timeline of the Space Race
 Yuri Kondratyuk
 Mikhail Yangel
 Vladimir Chelomey

Notes

References

Bibliography
 
 
 NASA segments
 (bibrec )

 

 "Testing of rocket and space technology – the business of my life" Events and facts – A.I. Ostashev, Korolev, 2001.Bibliography 1996-2004;
 "Top secret General" – E.T. Beloglazova, M: "the Heroes of the Fatherland", 2005. 
 "Red Moon Rising: Sputnik and the Hidden Rivalries that Ignited the Space Age", – Matthew Brzezinski, Henry Holt and Company, 2008 г. ;
 A.I. Ostashev, Sergey Pavlovich Korolyov – The Genius of the 20th Century — 2010 M. of Public Educational Institution of Higher Professional Training MGUL .
 Bank of the Universe – edited by Boltenko A. C., Kyiv, 2014., publishing house "Phoenix", 
 S. P. Korolev. Encyclopedia of life and creativity – edited by C. A. Lopota, RSC Energia. S. P. Korolev, 2014 
 "We grew hearts in Baikonur" – Author: Eliseev V. I. M: publisher OAO MPK in 2018, 
 "Space science city Korolev" – Author: Posamentir R. D. M: publisher SP Struchenevsky O. V., 
 "I look back and have no regrets. " - Author: Abramov, Anatoly Petrovich: publisher "New format" Barnaul, 2022.

External links

 Episode 47 of astrotalkuk.org Contains recording from the unveiling of Yuri Gagarin Statue event in London on 14 July 2011, includes Natalya Koroleva speaking about her father.
 Sergei Pavlovich Korolev (1907–1966) Biography, with several historic photographs provided by Natalya Koroleva.
 "Korolev, Mastermind of the Soviet Space Program" Biography, with a few photographs, by James Harford, adapted, in part, from the author's book.
 "Sergei Pavlovich Korolev" Biography by Phil Delnon dated May 1998.
 "Sergey P. Korolev. The Great Engineer and Scientist". Biography at the official website of Korolev, Moscow Oblast
 The official website of the city administration Baikonur – Honorary citizens of Baikonur
 Soviet and Russian space programmes
 PBS Red Files
 Korolev — detailed biography at Encyclopedia Astronautica
 Detailed biography at Centennial of Flight website
 Korolëv's slide rule  at the U.S. National Air and Space Museum. His German-made slide rule was a "magician's wand" to his colleagues.
 Photograph and description of monument to S. Korolev at the Kyiv Polytechnic Institute.
 Extensive collection of photographs and documents related to Korolev at the RGANTD (Russian State Archive for Scientific and Technical Documentation) 
 Family history
 Korolev as a student at KPI, 1924.

 
1907 births
1966 deaths
20th-century Russian engineers
Aviation inventors
Baikonur Cosmodrome
Bauman Moscow State Technical University alumni
Burials at the Kremlin Wall Necropolis
Central Aerohydrodynamic Institute employees
Communist Party of the Soviet Union members
Early spaceflight scientists
Employees of RSC Energia
Full Members of the USSR Academy of Sciences
Glider pilots
Gulag detainees
Heroes of Socialist Labour
Kyiv Polytechnic Institute alumni
Lenin Prize winners
Academic staff of the Moscow Institute of Physics and Technology
Military personnel from Zhytomyr
Recipients of the Order of Lenin
Rocket scientists
Russian aerospace engineers
Russian people of Belarusian descent
Russian people of Greek descent
Russian people of Polish descent
Russian people of Ukrainian descent
Sharashka inmates
Soviet aerospace engineers
Soviet rehabilitations
Soviet space program personnel
Ukrainian Cossacks
Ukrainian people of Belarusian descent
Ukrainian people of Greek descent
Ukrainian people of Polish descent
Ukrainian people of Russian descent
Soviet colonels